Stephen Oskoui is managing partner of Gigafund, a venture capital firm backing the world's most ambitious and transformative entrepreneurs. Gigafund makes long-term concentrated investments in founders and CEOs who are capable of growing with their companies and maximizing impact over a period of decades.

Personal life and education
Oskoui studied computer science at Stanford University. His accomplishments include publishing research in laser fusion and being named one of 40 Finalists in the acclaimed Westinghouse Science Talent Search.

Career
Oskoui launched Gigafund together with Luke Nosek (co-founder of PayPal and Founders Fund). Before co-founding Gigafund, Oskoui was a venture partner at Founders Fund. Prior to Founders Fund, Oskoui was founder and CEO of Smiley Media, a performance-based marketing company that drove more than $1 billion in sales for its clients. Smiley raised $0 of outside capital and grew into a two-time Inc. 500 company with $50 million in annual revenue. Oskoui was one of the first to apply A/B testing to run millions of marketing experiments. He built Smiley Media using a unique distributed team structure and talent assessment system, recruiting hundreds of the highest caliber people from over 20 different countries. As an angel investor, he made a $3 million investment in Rover and drove the M&A process that resulted in its merger with Revcontent.

Political activities
Oskoui, Jeffrey Harmon, Abe Niederhauser, and Ladd Christensen co-founded Endorse Liberty, a Super PAC supporting Ron Paul. Oskoui serves as president of the organization. Oskoui helped convince Peter Thiel, the founder of PayPal, to donate over $2 million to Endorse Liberty. In 2012, Oskoui donated $125,000 and provided $296,000 in in-kind media services.

References

Living people
American libertarians
Year of birth missing (living people)